Eupoecilia yubariana is a species of moth of the family Tortricidae. It is found in Japan on the island of Hokkaido.

References

Moths described in 2005
Eupoecilia